Karin Ireland is an American author.  Many of her books are self-help guides.

Biography
Ireland writes and teaches in two areas: how to live with peace and success instead of struggle, and how to communicate easily and effectively in the workplace. Her most recent book is The Job Survival Instruction Book: 400+ Tips, Trips, and Techniques to Stay Employed.

Ireland draws on a personal breast cancer experience as an exemplar of the power of self-help.  The experience, in which she rejected further recommended surgery after a lumpectomy, resulted in a 2004 memoir.

Ireland teaches communication training in business organizations.

Ireland resides in the San Francisco East Bay area of Fremont, California.

Selected works

Children's books 
 Don't Take your Snake for a Stroll, Harcourt (2003) and Scholastic Inc. (2005).
 Boost Your Child's Self-Esteem: Simple, Effective Ways to Build Children's Self-Respect and Confidence (2000)
 Wonderful Nature, Wonderful You, Dawn Publications (1996).

Other works

 Learning to Trust Myself: Lessons From Cancer and Other Life Dilemmas.
 The Job Survival Instruction Book: 400+ Tips, Tricks, and Techniques to Stay Employed, Third Edition, published by Course Technology PTR

External links
 Ireland's website
 Ireland's blog

American self-help writers
Living people
Year of birth missing (living people)
Place of birth missing (living people)
American children's writers
20th-century American non-fiction writers
21st-century American non-fiction writers
Writers from the San Francisco Bay Area
People from Fremont, California
20th-century American women writers
21st-century American women writers
American women non-fiction writers